Efficiency Vermont is a program that promotes and facilitates energy efficiency across the state of Vermont. Created in 2000 at the behest of the Vermont Public Service Board, it has substantially reduced electrical demand and more than balanced load growth in recent years. It is sometimes referred to as an energy efficiency utility. It is operated by the nonprofit Vermont Energy Investment Corporation.

References

External links
Efficiency Vermont

Energy conservation in the United States
Energy in Vermont
Organizations based in Vermont
2000 establishments in Vermont